Trigonospila fasciata is a species of fly in the family Tachinidae.

Distribution
Trigonospila fasciata is a common species in Tasmania, and may be present in Victoria.

References

Exoristinae
Diptera of Australasia
Insects described in 1934